The D19Er locomotive or Hữu Nghị locomotive is a diesel locomotive and currently used on Vietnam Railways network. (almost in Northern Vietnam railway network).

History 
These locomotives were built by CSR Ziyang company in China in 2006. They build 5 locomotives only. The D19Er locomotive is almost use for freight train and now, there is a line connecting Vietnam with Europe by rail and Vietnam Railways usually use these locomotives.

Information 
Manufacturer: CSR Ziyang (China)
Model: SDD3
Built: 2006
Gauge: 1,435 mm (Standard-gauge)
Power Type: Diesel
Loco weight: 108 t
Maximum speed: 120 km/h 
UIC: Co'Co'

References

CSR Ziyang Locomotive Co., Ltd. locomotives
Diesel locomotives of Vietnam
Standard gauge locomotives of Vietnam